Current and past governments of Afghanistan have included a Minister of Commerce in the Afghan cabinet. The Ministry of Commerce and Industries creates the enabling environment for sustainable and equitable economic growth and opportunity for all Afghans by promoting private sector development in a socially responsible free market economy. The Ministry has three basic goals: a) to promote the establishment and implementation of a legal and regulatory framework necessary for a free market economy b) to integrate Afghanistan into the regional and global economy and c) to facilitate and promote the development of a dynamic, competitive private sector.

After the fall of the Taliban, the 2001 Bonn Conference formed an interim government for Afghanistan. In this Government, there was one minister for Commerce, one minister for mines and industries and one minister for small industries. In 2004, when the newly elected President Hamid Karzai formed his first official government, the post of small industries was deleted. After 2006, when there was a major cabinet reshuffle, the minister of Commerce became more and more referred to as the minister of Commerce and Industries. The formal portfolio of the minister of mines is now without that of industries, although he still is sometimes referred to as minister of Mines and Industries.

After the reelection of President Karzai he formed a second administration. in January 2010 both of the candidates that Karzai nominated for the post, first Ghulam Mohammad Eylaghi and later Zahir Waheed, were voted down by the National Assembly, Eylaghi functioned for some time as acting minister of Commerce. Only in June 2010, when Karzai nominated Dr. Anwar-Ul-Haq Ahady as the new minister of Commerce, the ministry was led again by someone who was confirmed by the National Assembly.

Ministers

See also
 List of company registers

References

External links
 Ministry of Commerce and Industries

Commerce and Industries
Afghanistan